James Clarke, known as Jim Clarke, is a former Unionist politician in Northern Ireland.

Clarke became active in the Ulster Unionist Party (UUP), and was elected for the Laganbank area on Belfast City Council at the 1989 Northern Ireland local elections.  He held his seat in 1993, and was then also elected to the Northern Ireland Forum, representing Belfast South.  However, he failed to hold this seat at the 1998 Northern Ireland Assembly election.

In 1998, Clarke served as High Sheriff of Belfast, and he held his council seat in both 1997 and 2001 before standing down in 2005.  At that time, he was the chair of Belfast's Environmental Services Committee.

In 2000, it was announced that Clarke owed nine years' back subscription to the UUP's National Association of Councillors.  Clarke stated that he did not see any point in paying.

References

Year of birth missing (living people)
Living people
Members of Belfast City Council
High Sheriffs of Belfast
Members of the Northern Ireland Forum
Ulster Unionist Party councillors